Nick J Schwab Jr (April 24, 1912 – December 17, 1982) was an American painter, illustrator, and  marketer. Born and raised in Buffalo, New York, Nick began drawing and art at an early age. Nick designed the Iroquois Brewery logo and associated marketing materials, and his work was seen on millions of beer bottles.

Life

Early years

Nick J Schwab Jr. was born on April 24, 1912, in Buffalo New York, to Nicholas J Schwab and Clara M Schwab, born Hofmeyer. Nick was baptized Francis X Schwab, being named after his one of his six uncles. His interest in painting began at an early age, after submitting a drawing of a Native American as an entry to a Courier-Express sponsored contest. Nick won the contest, and its associated prize of $1, and his lifelong love of painting and drawing, with an emphasis on Native Americans, took hold.

Marketing years
Schwab was the Vice President of Advertising and Sales promotion for Iroquois Breweries.  In 1938 Nick re-created the Iroquois Brewery Indian Head trademark/logo, changing it from a European style Indian Head, to a more accurate depiction of a Native American, Iroquois Indian chief.

World War II
In 1943, during World War II, Schwab painted one of his most recognizable works, "Jungle Soldier". His painting was recognized by the Treasury War Finance Division, and considered for use as a poster in the Fifth War Loan Drive. The painting was used by the American Red Cross, and won Schwab national acclaim. A contemporary of Norman Rockwell, Schwab spent time with the famous illustrator, and received helpful criticism and encouragement from him.

Later career

After nearly 20 years of leading the marketing and advertising initiatives of Iroquois Breweries, Schwab moved to Cincinnati, in 1965. He became director of research and development for the American Sign and Display Company. His passion for painting and drawing never waned, as he continued to paint until his death.

Death
Schwab died on December 17, 1982, at the age 70 in Cincinnati, Ohio. He was survived by his widow, his son and three daughters, and his three sisters.

Major works
 Jungle Soldier (1944)
 Red Tomahawk & Sitting Bull (1948)
 Calf Child 
 Sitting Bull 
 Wolf Collar 
 Comanche's Pinto
 Kiontwogky (Chief Corn Planter)
 Reprieve (1964)

References

1912 births
1982 deaths
Artists from Buffalo, New York
Painters from New York (state)
American illustrators
American marketing people
Artists from Cincinnati